Yelshanka is a rural locality (a selo) in Michurinskoye Rural Settlement, Kamyshinsky District, Volgograd Oblast, Russia. The population was 278 as of 2010. There are 13 streets.

Geography 
Yelshanka is located on the Volga Upland, on the Yelshanka River, 13 km north of Kamyshin (the district's administrative centre) by road. Michurinsky is the nearest rural locality.

References 

Rural localities in Kamyshinsky District